Wallace Fernando Pereira (born 29 October 1986 in Cerquilho) is a Brazilian professional footballer who plays as a left back.

Career

Fredrikstad
After three seasons played at FC Sheriff Tiraspol, Wallace signed for Fredrikstad on 19 February 2008. He quickly adapted to his new surroundings, and his trademark free kick goals made him a crowd favourite.

Gent
On 31 August 2010, Wallace signed a 3-year deal with Belgian club Gent.
On 1 December 2010, he netted the only goal in a 1:0 win against Levski Sofia in a UEFA Europa League game and helped preserve his team's chances of progression to the next stage of the competition.

Hoverla
On 5 March 2014, Wallace signed with Ukrainian Premier League side Hoverla.

Xanthi FC
Ον 29 July 2014, Wallace joined Superleague club Xanthi on a three-year contract.
On 31 May 2017, Xanthi officially announced that his contract wouldn't be renewed.

AEL
On 31 May 2017, Wallace stayed in the Superleague, after signing with AEL a two-year contract on a free transfer.

References

External links
 Wallace at Guardian Stats Centre 
 

1986 births
Living people
Brazilian footballers
Brazilian expatriate footballers
Expatriate footballers in Moldova
Expatriate footballers in Norway
Expatriate footballers in Belgium
Expatriate footballers in Ukraine
Expatriate footballers in Greece
Brazilian expatriate sportspeople in Moldova
Brazilian expatriate sportspeople in Norway
Brazilian expatriate sportspeople in Belgium
Brazilian expatriate sportspeople in Ukraine
Brazilian expatriate sportspeople in Greece
São Carlos Futebol Clube players
FC Sheriff Tiraspol players
Fredrikstad FK players
K.A.A. Gent players
FC Hoverla Uzhhorod players
Xanthi F.C. players
Athlitiki Enosi Larissa F.C. players
Esporte Clube Pelotas players
Esporte Clube XV de Novembro (Piracicaba) players
Eliteserien players
Belgian Pro League players
Ukrainian Premier League players
Super League Greece players
Association football defenders